Ricardo Guimarães (4 January 1909 – 14 January 1974) was a Brazilian sprinter. He competed in the men's 100 metres at the 1932 Summer Olympics.

References

1909 births
1974 deaths
Athletes (track and field) at the 1932 Summer Olympics
Brazilian male sprinters
Olympic athletes of Brazil
Place of birth missing